Duna Media Service Provider, also known as simply Duna Média, is Hungary's public service broadcaster for radio, television and new media. The company was established in July 2015 and operates six TV channels, seven radio stations, a news agency and online services.

History
Duna Media is the result of a merger between the former public service broadcasters Magyar Televízió (MTV), Magyar Rádió (MR) and Duna TV, as well as the Hungarian news agency Magyar Távirati Iroda (MTI). This nonprofit organization is the legal successor to each of the four formerly separate entities managed by Médiaszolgáltatás-támogató és Vagyonkezelő Alap (MTVA).

Duna Media is a member of the European Broadcasting Union (EBU) and is funded by MTVA.

As of 1 January 2023, the organisational structure has changed significantly. Instead of the previous four directorates, only two will be responsible for content. The former Directorates have been reorganised under the new Content Directorate, the other new Directorate is the Content Development Directorate, which will have a small creative team, and the Strategy Office, which until now was the "creative manager". Both directorates are headed by external managers, the former being Zoltán István Tóth, former member of the Television Jury of the National Film Institute and 777blog, a 777blog committed to Christian values. hu video creative producer (he used to head the Country Image Centre and worked at Hír TV and MTVA);  the latter is Róbert Kárász, who has been a presenter at ATV since 2017 (he used to work at TV2 and RTL; see also the Critics section for his appointment).

Services

See also
 Mass media in Hungary

References

External links

 

2015 establishments in Hungary
MTVA (Hungary)
Publicly funded broadcasters
State media
Television in Hungary
Radio in Hungary
Mass media in Budapest
Organisations based in Budapest
European Broadcasting Union members